Freshwater Blue is an Australian reality-drama series created by Toby Yoshimura and Ben Alcott for MTV Australia. The series follows the lives of twelve friends who have completed their secondary education and face the challenges of friendship and relationship issues as well as becoming young adults. The show is set in the Northern Beaches suburb Freshwater. The show's opening theme song, "What Happens Next", was written and performed by American band The Material.

Production

Development
Freshwater Blue was created by Toby Yoshimura who had previously worked as a producer for television network NBC. Yoshimura, who was trying to contrive a concept for a reality television show, acquired inspiration by a programme that was being developed in the United States, relating to Spring Break. It is also inspired by other MTV series from the US such as Laguna Beach: The Real Orange County, The Hills . Yoshimura pondered what Australian teenagers did when they finished high school and after further research came across the annual Schoolies week held in the Gold Coast. After travelling to Australia and discovering that Schoolies wasn't as untamed as Spring Break he opted to create a real life drama of what happens after school stating,
The show for me was a diary of a girl and her friends as she stumbles through[...] the most important time of her life, right after school and in between real life[...] it's real life decisions with alcohol and bikinis.
The programme was produced by production company, Freehand, and was broadcast online via the shows official website and social networking site Facebook. The show first aired on the official website on 2 March 2010 with each episode running for eight-ten minutes. On 25 October 2010 it was announced by MTV Australia that they had picked up the series with Rebecca Batties from the network stating "After seeing a webisode[..] the MTV team and I instantly loved it. We knew intrinsically that if we added MTV’s trademark production values, we could take it to a wider Australian youth audience[...]" There are no plans for a second season of this series.

Cast

Nicola Johnson
Luke Scott
Monique Sheehan
Annika Tyr-Egge
Joey Crutch
Lize Poole
Jesse Morgan
Alex Antonopolis
Rob Wentworth
Emily Twiby
Ruby Smith
Ruth Williams
Courtney Bliss

Episodes

Season 1 (2010–2011) 

The first season of Freshwater Blue premiered on 2 December 2010 and will consist of 8 episodes.

See also
The Shire (TV series)
Laguna Beach: The Real Orange County
Newport Harbor: The Real Orange County
The Hills
The City
Fade Street

References

External links 
 
 

2010 Australian television series debuts
2011 Australian television series endings
2010s Australian reality television series
MTV original programming
English-language television shows
Television shows set in Sydney
Television series by Freehand Productions